Susana Armenteros (born 11 August 1961) is a retired Cuban sprinter who specialized in the 100 and 200 metres.

She won the silver medal at the 1983 Central American and Caribbean Championships (100 m), the silver medal at the 1986 Ibero-American Championships (200 m), finished seventh at the 1987 Pan American Games (200 m) and finished fifth at the 1988 Ibero-American Championships (both 100 and 200 m) Armenteros also became Cuban champion.

In the 4 × 100 metres relay she won a gold medal at the 1986 Central American and Caribbean Games, a bronze medal at the 1986 Ibero-American Championships, a silver medal at the 1987 Pan American Games and finished seventh at the 1987 World Championships.

References

1961 births
Living people
Cuban female sprinters
World Athletics Championships athletes for Cuba
Central American and Caribbean Games gold medalists for Cuba
Pan American Games silver medalists for Cuba
Athletes (track and field) at the 1983 Pan American Games
Athletes (track and field) at the 1987 Pan American Games
Pan American Games medalists in athletics (track and field)
Central American and Caribbean Games medalists in athletics
Competitors at the 1986 Central American and Caribbean Games
Medalists at the 1987 Pan American Games
20th-century Cuban women
20th-century Cuban people